This is the discography of Cantopop artist Andy Lau.
Note: Compilations with no new material are not included on this list. English titles in italic indicates the name is simply a translation of the Chinese title as no official English title exists.  Most translations were processed through Google Translate.

Albums

References

Lau, Andy
Pop music discographies